Filmklik was a VOD service offering online streaming to customers in Hungary. Established in 2007 and headquartered in Budapest, the service offered movies from a large online catalogue always available on its platform. All the film content of the site was under DRM protection. In 2008, the distributor A Company acquired a stake in the company and developed plans to roll out the service outside Hungary. On its turn, the A Company including Filmklik was acquired by Alexander Rodnyansky.

Films
Filmklik offered movies, which can either be downloaded to be burned on DVD and/or streamed instantly for 48 hours. Filmklik's library includes independent, international and studio films.

References

Variety: “Germany, Hungary deal for VOD”
Europa Distribution: "The new challenge of VOD"

External links
Filmklik home page

Video on demand services
Internet properties established in 2007
Hungarian companies established in 2007